Liu Xiaoyu (born on 14 March 1989 in Changchun, Jilin) is a Chinese professional basketball player for the Bay Area Dragons of the East Asia Super League (EASL). He is a member of the Chinese men's national basketball team and played multiple international tournaments including the 2013 FIBA Asia Championship, 2014 Asian Games and 2017 FIBA Asia Cup.

In 2022, Liu signed with the Dragons.

References 

 
 
 

1989 births
Living people
Basketball players from Changchun
Beijing Ducks players
Chinese men's basketball players
Guangdong Southern Tigers players
Shanghai Sharks players
Point guards
Basketball players at the 2014 Asian Games
Asian Games competitors for China
Chinese expatriate basketball people in the Philippines
21st-century Chinese people
Bay Area Dragons players